Green Coca-Cola Bottles s a 1962 painting by Andy Warhol that depicts one hundred and twelve almost identical Coca-Cola bottles. 

Andy Warhol produced at least four notable Coca-Cola paintings in the 1960s, with Green Coca-Cola Bottles being one of them. As part of the same series, Warhol created Coca-Cola (3), among others.

Origin & painting
Warhol created several notable works in the early 1960s. This began with the famous Campbell's Soup Cans, which was completed between 1961 and early 1962. During this period, Warhol experimented with numerous common items, before creating the Green Coca-Cola Bottles painting in 1962. This period is often referred back to as Warhol's earlier work.

In his early days as an artist, Warhol experimented with the Coca-Cola bottle beginning in the 1950s. The first known artwork of Warhol's was an ink-on-gouache drawing of a Coca-Cola bottle with a pair of legs. In the early 1960s, before the creation of Campbell's Soup Cans, he used to tear Coca-Cola bottle images from magazines to use them in collages.

This inspiration and early use of the Coca-Cola bottle led him to create Green Coca-Cola Bottles in 1962.

Green Coca-Cola Bottles took a mainstream item and converted it into a piece of art. Warhol’s piece utilized a silkscreen technique, which mechanicalized some aspects of the painting but featured individualized “unevenness” across the painting. The painting engenders an optimistic message for the American public, described in Warhol’s own words, “What’s grand about this country is that America started the tradition where the richest consumers buy essentially the same thing as the poorest... you can know that the President drinks Coke, Liz Taylor drinks Coke, and, just think, you can drink Coke, too. A Coke is a Coke, and no amount of money can get you a better Coke.”

Early Coca-Cola painting series
Andy Warhol's relationship with Coca-Cola began early in his career when he created several Coca-Cola themed paintings. One such work was the creation of Green Coca-Cola Bottles, which was part of a wider series of four paintings. According to a friend of Warhol's, he began to focus on pop art paintings of Coca-Cola bottles and asked for critique on them. "It wasn't until he did the series of Coke bottles and got the feedback ... that he found his genre."

Warhol also famously created Coca-Cola (3), which sold recently for a large sum at Christie's. 

Throughout his career, he created 15 artworks related to Coca-Cola, according to the corporation.

Exhibitions
Green Coca-Cola Bottles was exhibited at Coca-Cola's An American Icon At 100, celebrating the Coke bottle's 100th year since it was created. it is currently housed in New York City at the Whitney Museum of American Art.

References

1962 paintings
Paintings by Andy Warhol
Coca-Cola in popular culture
Paintings in the collection of the Whitney Museum of American Art